Kenny Murphy may refer to:

 Kenny Murphy (soccer) (born 1956), Scottish footballer who played international football for Australia
 Kenny Murphy (rugby union) (born 1966), former Irish rugby union player